The 1903 Brown Bears football team represented Brown University as an independent during the 1903 college football season. Led by Dave Fultz in his first and only season as head coach, Brown compiled a record of 5–4–1. The team was led by first-year head coach Dave Fultz.

Schedule

References

Brown
Brown Bears football seasons
Brown Bears football